Cattleya lueddemanniana is a labiate Cattleya species of orchid.  The diploid chromosome number of C. lueddemanniana has been determined as 2n = 40.

References

External links

lueddemanniana
lueddemanniana